Fortress (stylized as F O R T R E S S) is the Miniature Tigers' second full-length album. It was released on July 27, 2010.

Track listing 
 "Mansion of Misery" – 3:36
 "Rock N' Roll Mountain Troll" – 3:44
 "Dark Tower" – 4:09
 "Goldskull" – 2:36 (featuring Neon Indian)
 "Bullfighter Jacket" – 3:21
 "Egyptian Robe" – 5:29
 "Japanese Woman Living In My Closet" – 1:58
 "Tropical Birds" – 2:55
 "Lolita" – 5:22
 "Coyote Enchantment" – 3:51

References

2010 albums
Miniature Tigers albums